The 2022 Rhode Island Rams football team represented the University of Rhode Island as a member of the Colonial Athletic Association (CAA) during the 2022 NCAA Division I FCS football season. The Rams, led by ninth-year head coach Jim Fleming, played their home games at Meade Stadium.

Previous season

The Rams finished the 2021 season with a record of 7–4 (4–4 in the CAA). They finished in a 5-way tie for fourth place. Rhode Island started the season unranked, but climbed as high as No. 12 after a 5–0 start by week six. Rhode Island would drop off the rankings in week nine after three straight losses against Towson, No. 5 Villanova, and Maine. They would come back into the rankings in week eleven at No. 25, but they dropped off the rankings again the next week with a loss against Elon.

The team finished the 2021 season unranked.

Schedule

Game summaries

at Stony Brook

at Bryant

No. 9 Delaware

at No. 24 (FBS) Pittsburgh

Brown

No. 14 Elon

at Monmouth

at No. 10 William & Mary

Maine

at No. 21 New Hampshire

Albany

Rankings

Personnel

Coaching staff

Roster

Statistics

Team

Individual leaders

Offense

Defense

Key: POS: Position, SOLO: Solo Tackles, AST: Assisted Tackles, TOT: Total Tackles, SACK: Quarterback Sacks, SACK–YDS: Sack Yards, PD: Passes Defended, INT: Interceptions, INT–YDS: Interception Yards, LNG: Long Interception, TD: Interception Touchdowns, FR: Fumbles Recovered, FF: Forced Fumbles, FTD: Fumbles Touchdown

Special teams

Scoring
Rhode Island vs Non-Conference Opponents

Rhode Island vs CAA Opponents

Rhode Island vs All Opponents

References

Rhode Island
Rhode Island Rams football seasons
Rhode Island Rams football